The Ashwood Sports Club is a sports club located in the south-eastern suburbs of Melbourne, Victoria. The club is mostly known for its Australian rules football team, which currently plays in the Division 3 of Southern Football Netball League. 

Apart from football, other sports practiced at Ashwood are basketball, cricket and netball.

Overview
Ashwood Football Club was formed in 1985 by means of a merger between Burwood and Essex Heights Football Clubs.

Ashwood play their home games at Essex Heights Reserve, which is on the border of Ashwood and Mount Waverley in Melbourne, Victoria.

The club currently has a senior and reserves teams as well as Juniors boys and Girl teams .

Senior premierships
 Southern Football League (2): 1996, 2001

References

External links
 Official website
 Ashwood Football website

Australian rules football clubs in Melbourne
Southern Football League (Victoria)
Australian rules football clubs established in 1985
1985 establishments in Australia
Sport in the City of Monash